Alberto Schiavi (born 23 March 1939) is an Italian sprint canoer who competed in the early 1960s. At the 1960 Summer Olympics in Rome, he was eliminated in the semifinals of the K-1 4 × 500 m event.

References
Sports-reference.com profile

1939 births
Canoeists at the 1960 Summer Olympics
Italian male canoeists
Living people
Olympic canoeists of Italy
Place of birth missing (living people)
20th-century Italian people